Theatre Royal is a 1943 British comedy film directed by John Baxter and starring Bud Flanagan, Chesney Allen and Lydia Sherwood. The plot concerns an attempt by the staff of a theatre to prevent its closure.

The film's sets were designed by C. Wilfred Arnold.

Plot
A London theatre is threatened with closure, but its staff fight to raise funds and secure the support of an important backer. The owners Parker and Maxwell try to prevent Harding from buying it but must find money.

They find a rich old American, Clement J. Earle, and try to get money out of him, but also trick him buying antique furniture in an old country house.

As Flanagan and Allen sleep together in a huge ornate bed the ghosts of the old house appear. Flanagan dreams they are Sir Francis Drake and Walter Raleigh meeting Queen Elizabeth I.

They audition the background helpers in the theatre to create a show including George the handyman. During the auditions they hear a wonderful female voice offstage and bring her on. She is the wonderful Welsh soprano Gwen Catleysoprano.

Flanagan and Allen put on blackface and sing on stage as a toff nd his chauffeur. They sing "I'll Always Have Time for You". From the stage they spot Harding in the audience.

Parker and George meet Harding's representative in a bar. They spot the man drugging the drinks so they swap them. Harding falls asleep. They steal his wallet for evidence.

The next protege on stage is nine-year-old Victor Feldman who drums excellently as the orchestra support him. He latterly became a proponent of modern jazz drumming in the UK and US, appearing with Ronnie Scott and Miles Davis, amongst others.

Mr Earle comes back and together with an English backer, Mr Bowman, they back a new show "Shake Partner". The show starts with the soprano coming out of a huge clam shell. She is joined by twenty ballerinas.

Flanagan and Allen put on top hat and tails and end the show.

Cast

References

External links

1943 films
1943 comedy films
1940s English-language films
British comedy films
Films directed by John Baxter
Films set in England
British black-and-white films
Films shot at British National Studios
1940s British films